Santa (1932) is the first Mexican narrative sound film. It was directed by Antonio Moreno and starred Lupita Tovar, based on the novel of the same name by Federico Gamboa. It had its world premiere in San Antonio. In 1994, the Mexican magazine Somos published their list of "The 100 best movies of the cinema of Mexico" in its 100th edition and named Santa its 67th choice.

Plot

A Mexican girl named Santa (Tovar) is seduced and abandoned by a soldier, Marcelino. Rejected by her family and friends, she finds shelter in a brothel in Mexico City. After meeting Santa, the blind piano player Hipólito (Orellana) falls in love with her but is ridiculed by those around him. After she is rejected by her romantic partner Jarameno (due to the meddling of a suddenly returned Marcelino), Hipólito invites Santa to live with him and they attend church together. Later Santa becomes ill and Hipólito goes to the hospital to be with her but she passes away.

Cast
 Lupita Tovar as Santa
 Carlos Orellana as Hipólito
 Juan José Martínez Casado as Jarameño
 Donald Reed as Marcelino
 Antonio R. Frausto as Fabián
 Mimí Derba as Doña Elvira
 Rosita Arriaga as Santa's Mother
 Joaquín Busquets as Esteban
 Feliciano Rueda as Drunk at brothel
 Jorge Peón as Genarillo
 Alberto Martí as Jarameño's friend
 Ricardo Carti as Doctor
 Sofía Álvarez as Prostitute 1
 Rosa Castro as Prostitute 2
 Nena Betancourt as Singer

References

External links 
 

1932 films
Mexican black-and-white films
1930s Spanish-language films
1932 drama films
Films based on Mexican novels
Mexican drama films
1930s Mexican films